The Third Courier is a 1989 video game developed by Manley & Associates and published by Accolade.

Gameplay
The Third Courier is a game set during Cold War Germany.

Reception
ACE (Advanced Computer Entertainment) reviewed the game in their January 1990 issue and called it "a disappointment", and in their July 1990 issue gave it a rating of 65% and commented that "If you think living in an oppressed society is romantic and exciting, you probably deserve to play this game."

Dennis Owens reviewed the game for Computer Gaming World and commented that "The Third Courier should have been the sophisticated rock and rolling superspy story that it wants to be (indeed, its fiction is strong and its puzzles are tricky). Instead, its mechanics make it awkward and slow."

Zzap! reviewed the game in their June 1990 issue and gave it a rating of 43% overall, and stated that "If exploring Berlin, talking to drunks and visiting every accessible establishment on every street in an effort to find the odd clue sounds like fun to you, well, I recommend this sleuthing RPG. Otherwise forget it."

Amiga Action reviewed the game in their July 1990 issue and gave it a rating of 62% overall, describing it a merely average game.

John Scott for Games International said that "I was disappointed - The Third Courier is a different type of game altogether. I expect that this format of game altogether. I expect that this format of game must appeal to some people, since it keeps reappearing in various guises, but it does nothing for me, other than give me an overwhelming urge to go watch some paint dry."

Reviews
White Wolf #19 (Feb./March, 1990).
ASM (Aktueller Software Markt) - Dec, 1989
The Games Machine - Mar, 1990

References

External links
The Third Courier at Atari Mania
German magazine articles
Review in Compute!

1989 video games
Adventure games
Amiga games
Apple IIGS games
Atari ST games
Cold War video games
DOS games
Spy video games
Video games developed in the United States
Video games set in Germany